Funkturm Stuttgart is a reinforced concrete transmitting tower, built in 1966 on the Raichberg of Stuttgart, Germany. The radio tower is not accessible to the public. It is 93 meters high and serves the police and fire-brigade radio.

References
Hackelsberger, Christoph and Joerg Schlaich Türme sind Träume (Towers are Dreams), avedition GmbH, Ludwigsburg (Germany), 2001, p. 8.

External links
 
 http://www.skyscraperpage.com/diagrams/?b39049
 Picture on Google-Maps

Communication towers in Germany
Buildings and structures in Stuttgart
1966 establishments in West Germany
Towers completed in 1966